Dracophyllum filifolium is a species of shrub or tree endemic to the North, South, and Stewart Islands of New Zealand. It was first described by Joseph Dalton Hooker in 1853 and gets the specific epithet filifolium for its leaves being like a filament. A 2017 assessment using the New Zealand Threat Classification System classified it as “Not Threatened,” giving it an estimated population of more than 100,000.

References

Citations 

filifolium
Endemic flora of New Zealand